The 1997 NCAA Women's Division I Swimming and Diving Championships were contested at the 16th annual NCAA-sanctioned swim meet to determine the team and individual national champions of Division I women's collegiate swimming and diving in the United States. 

This year's events were hosted at the Indiana University Natatorium in Indianapolis, Indiana. 

USC topped the team standings, finishing just 11 points ahead of five-time defending champions Stanford; it was the Trojans' first women's team title.

Team standings
Note: Top 10 only
(DC) = Defending champions
Full results

See also
List of college swimming and diving teams

References

NCAA Division I Swimming And Diving Championships
NCAA Division I Swimming And Diving Championships
NCAA Division I Women's Swimming and Diving Championships